Rolland Henry "Ronnie" Randell (15 March 1886 – 22 October 1978) was a South African first-class cricketer and lawyer.

Ronnie Randell played first-class cricket for Border from 1907 to 1925, usually as a batsman, but sometimes also as a wicket-keeper. His highest score was 71 for Border against the touring MCC in 1913-14, when he shared in an opening partnership of 114 before he was first out.

He spent his whole life in King William's Town. Born there, he was educated there at Dale College, and later practised there as a lawyer for more than 60 years.

References

External links

1886 births
1978 deaths
South African cricketers
Border cricketers
Sportspeople from Qonce